Matilde Margherita Mary Capuis (1 January 1913 – 31 January 2017) was an Italian organist, pianist, music educator and composer. She was born in Naples and studied at the Benedetto Marcello conservatory in Venice with Gabriele Bianchi and at the Luigi Cherubini Conservatory in Florence.

After completing her studies, she took a position at the Conservatorio Giuseppe Verdi of Turin where she became chair of theory and then composition. For many years she performed in a duo with cellist Hugh Attilio Scabia.

Capuis died in 2017 at the age of 104.

Works
Capuis' compositions include:
Symphony in G major
Concentus brevis (Concerto) for oboe and string orchestra (1975)
Overture for orchestra
Variations for orchestra
Corale for organ, string orchestra and two horns
Dialogue for string orchestra
Leggenda par la Notte di Natale for string orchestra
Three Moments for cello and string orchestra
Fantasia
Preludio e fughetta
Suite in Miniature for piano trio
Sonata No. 1 in C Minor for cello and piano
Sonata No. 2 in D Minor for cello and piano
Sonata No. 3 in F-sharp Minor for cello and piano (1966)
Sonata No. 4 in G major for cello and piano (1975)
Sonata No. 5 for cello and piano (1980)
Elegy for cello and piano
Theme and Variations for cello and piano
Sonata in Mi Minore for piano
Dodici Liriche
Il pianto della Madonna for soli, choir and orchestra

Her works have been recorded and issued on CD, including:
Matilde Capuis: Works for Cello and Piano Vol. 1 (Duo Capuis) (6 Aug 2007) Audite, ASIN: B000027BGJ
Debut: Lieder von Komponistinnen [Lieder by Women Composers, Performed by Women Students] (September 24, 2002) Cavalli, ASIN: B00006IZN7

References

1913 births
2017 deaths
20th-century classical composers
20th-century Italian composers
Women classical composers
Italian centenarians
Italian classical composers
Italian music educators
Italian organists
Musicians from Naples
Women centenarians
Women music educators
Women organists
20th-century women composers